Sounthirajan Kumaraswamy is an Indian mechanical engineer from Coimbatore, Tamil Nadu who invented Super Sonic Hydrogen IC Engine, the first water-based engine that uses hydrogen as fuel and releases oxygen.

References

Year of birth missing (living people)
Living people
Indian mechanical engineers
People from Coimbatore